The Guidance Patrol or morality police is an Islamic religious police force and vice squad in the Law Enforcement Command of the Islamic Republic of Iran. The Guidance Patrol enforces Sharia—Islamic law—per laws in Iran; this is most often the enforcement of Islamic dress code, such as ensuring women in the country wear hijabs. The Guidance Patrol was formed in 2005 as a successor organisation to the older Islamic Revolution Committees, and reports to the Supreme Leader.

History

Since the 1979 Iranian Islamic Revolution, Iranian law has required all women in Iran to wear hijabs that cover their head and neck, and conceal their hair.

In the 1980s, the Islamic Revolution Committees served the function of the Islamic religious police in Iran. In 2005, the Guidance Patrol became its successor organisation. The Guidance Patrol reports directly to the Supreme Leader of Iran.

On 2013's Iranian Mother's Day, the patrols rewarded women with flowers for wearing chador (the preferred hijab style).

According to Iran's Interior Minister, in a three-month period in 2014, 220,000 women were taken to police stations and signed statements in which they promised to wear hijabs. A further 19,000 were given hair-covering notices, and 9,000 were detained. In 2014, the police additionally gave warnings and guidance to 3.6 million other Iranians who failed to follow the Islamic dress code.

In 2015, in an eight-month period police in Tehran stopped 40,000 women driving in Tehran for not obeying Islamic rules of proper dress, and impounded the cars of most of them, generally for a week. In 2016, Tehran used 7,000 undercover Guidance Patrol officers to catch violators of the Islamic dress code.

The Guidance Patrol has also harassed trans women for lack of gender conformity. When an Iranian trans woman was beaten in April 2018, police refused to help her.

Iran also banned the use of makeup by women, but many women resisted the ban, risking arrest.

Activities
Guidance patrols usually consist of a van with a male crew accompanied by chador-clad females who stand at busy public places (e.g., shopping centres, squares, and subway stations), to arrest women not wearing hijabs or not wearing them in accordance with government standards.  According to Amnesty International, "girls as young as seven years old" are forced to wear the hijab. The United Nations Human Rights Office said young Iranian women were violently slapped in the face, beaten with batons, and pushed into police vans. The women are driven to a correctional facility or police station, lectured on how to dress, have their photos taken by the police and personal information recorded, required to destroy any "bad" clothing with scissors, and generally released to relatives the same day though many are detained.  Under Article 683 of Iran's Islamic Penal Code, the penalty for a woman not wearing the hijab consists of imprisonment from 10 days to two months, and a fine of 50,000 to 500,000 Iranian rials. Violators may also be lashed, up to 74 times.

The Guidance Patrol also monitors immodest attire by men, "Western-style" haircuts worn by men, male-female fraternization, violations of restrictions on the wearing of makeup, and the wearing of bright colours, tight clothing, torn jeans, and short trousers. Violations include too much hair showing from under a headscarf, and a boyfriend and girlfriend taking a walk together. 

Members of the public may turn one another in for perceived violations of the dress code, and traffic cameras are also used to identify violators of the dress code. Iran's CCTV camera systems, including those from cafes, universities, and kindergartens, transmit their footage to the police.

On 27 December 2017, Brigadier General Hossein Rahimi, head of the Greater Tehran police, said: "According to the commander of the NAJA, those who do not observe Islamic values and have negligence in this area will no longer be taken to detention centers, a legal case will not be made for them, and we will not send them to court; rather, education classes to reform their behavior will be offered."

Controversies

On September 13, 2022, the Guidance Patrol arrested Mahsa Amini, a 22-year-old Iranian woman, for allegedly wearing her hijab improperly, in a manner that allowed some of her hair to be visible under her hijab. She died in their custody; they claimed she suffered heart failure, and consequently died comatose two days later. Bruises on her legs and face suggested to many that she was beaten, despite police denials. Multiple medical officials and detainees that witnessed her arrest claim that Guidance Patrol officials tortured her in the back of a van before arriving at the station. Her abduction and subsequent murder inspired a wave of protests in Iran, including at Tehran University and at Kasra Hospital, where she died.

Sanctions
On 22 September 2022, during the Mahsa Amini protests, the United States Department of the Treasury announced sanctions against the Guidance Patrol as well as seven senior leaders of Iran's various security organisations, "for violence against protestors and the death of Mahsa Amini". These include Mohammad Rostami Cheshmeh Gachi, chief of Iran’s Morality Police, Haj Ahmad Mirzaei, head of the Tehran division of the Morality Police, and other Iranian security officials. The sanctions involve blocking any properties or interests in property within the jurisdiction of the U.S., and reporting them to the U.S. Treasury. Penalties would be imposed on any parties that facilitate transactions or services to the sanctioned entities.

On 26 September 2022, Canadian Prime Minister Justin Trudeau stated that the Government of Canada would impose sanctions on the Guidance Patrol, its leadership, and the officials responsible for the death of Mahsa Amini and the crackdown on protestors.

Religious differences of opinion

Some officials say that in their view the Guidance Patrol is a Islamic religious police, fulfilling the Islamic obligation to enjoin what is proper and forbid that which is improper, and is desired by the people. Others oppose the Guidance Patrol's existence on the grounds that the authorities should respect citizens' freedom and dignity, and enforce Iranian law but not enforce Islam. The Guidance Patrol has been called un-Islamic by some, mostly because performing the requisites is haram (forbidden) when it leads to sedition. Some argue the notion should be a mutual obligation, allowing people to instruct government officials, but in practise it is strictly limited to one side.

Alleged dissolution
The Attorney General of Iran, Mohammad Jafar Montazeri, stated in Qom on 3 December 2022 that the police Guidance Patrol is not under the supervision of the judiciary system and was in the process of being disbanded. He also said that the hijab law is under review. However, as of 5 December the Iranian government had not made any official confirmation regarding the disbanding of the guidance patrol, and the Iranian state media denied its dissolution. It was reported that enforcement of the mandatory hijab and the guidance patrol had intensified, particularly in religious cities. In response, a three-day general strike was called by protestors, with shopkeepers closing their businesses; several experts and protestors alleged that the news of the dissolution had been announced by the Iranian government to overshadow coverage of the strike. Iranian state-run Arabic language channel Al Alam News Network denied any dissolution of the Guidance Patrol and added that "the maximum impression that can be taken" from Montazeri's comment is that the morality police and his branch of government, the judiciary, are unrelated.

See also
 Ministry for the Propagation of Virtue and the Prevention of Vice (Afghanistan)
 Committee for the Propagation of Virtue and the Prevention of Vice (Gaza Strip)
 Committee for the Promotion of Virtue and the Prevention of Vice (Saudi Arabia)
 Iranian protests against compulsory hijab
 Homa Darabi, Iranian woman known for her self-immolation protesting the compulsory hijab
 Zahra Bani Yaghoub, Iranian woman who died in police custody after being arrested for an alleged breach of modesty laws
 Mahsa Amini, Kurdish Iranian woman who died in police custody after being arrested for an alleged breach of modesty laws, causing mass protests in the country
 Reza Zarei, former chief of Tehran Police in charge of the Guidance Patrol who was found in a house of prostitution, was arrested, and lost his post

Notes

References

External links

Travis Beard (April 1, 2008). "Hair Police; It’s only recently that Iranian men have become the target of ultraconservative, style-cramping campaigns," Vice.
"Who are Iran’s hated morality police?; They are a recent innovation, not a core tenet of Islam," The Economist, September 26, 2022.
Pardis Mahdavi (September 26, 2022). "Opinion; When Iran’s ‘morality police’ came for me," The Washington Post.
"The history of Iran's so-called morality police," NPR, September 30, 2022 (audio).

 
2005 establishments in Iran
2022 disestablishments in Iran
Law Enforcement Command of Islamic Republic of Iran
Clericalism in Iran
Clothing controversies
Human rights abuses in Iran
Islam and government
Islam-related controversies
Islamic extremism
Islamic religious police
Islamism in Iran
Law enforcement in Iran
Organizations that oppose LGBT rights
LGBT in Iran
Religious discrimination
Sex segregation enforcement
Sharia in Iran
Women in Iran
Mahsa Amini protests
Iranian entities subject to the U.S. Department of the Treasury sanctions